The 1991 New Jersey General Assembly election was held on November 5, 1991.

The elections took place midway through Jim Florio's term as Governor of New Jersey. As in the State Senate elections, the Republican Party won a historic landslide, gaining 21 seats to win control of both chambers of the state legislature.

Background

Redistricting 

As required, the New Jersey legislature redistricted its state legislative districts in advance of the 1991 election. Redistricting was on balance considered to have favored Republicans.

Tax increase 
A centerpiece of the Florio administration's legislative agenda was the passage of a $2.8 billion tax increase. Republicans centered their 1991 campaign on opposition to the increase, as did even some incumbent Democrats, such as Senator Paul Contillo.

According to the Florio administration, the tax increase was designed to aid blue-collar workers, who were "also the people most upset by enactment of the taxes."

Gun control 
Another major legislative achievement of the Florio administration was a strict gun control measure. The bill's passage led the National Rifle Association to spend nearly $250,000 in the 1991 elections targeting candidates in both parties who had voted in favor of the bill and supporting those who pledged to repeal it.

Incumbents not running for re-election

Democratic 

 Anthony S. Marsella (District 4) (ran for State Senate)
 John Paul Doyle (District 10) (ran for State Senate)
 David C. Schwartz (District 17)
 Jim McGreevey (District 19) (lost party support, ran for Mayor of Woodbridge)
 Michael F. Adubato (District 28)
 Bob Menendez (District 31) (ran for State Senate)
 Joseph Mecca (District 34) (ran for State Senate)
 John Girgenti (District 35) (ran for State Senate)

Additionally, several Democrats resigned their seats late in the 1991 campaign to join the Florio administration, including Joseph D. Patero, Edward H. Salmon, Frank M. Pelly.

Republican 

 Dolores Cooper (District 2) (ran for State Senate as independent, but dropped out)
 Joe Kyrillos (District 13) (ran for State Senate)
 Chuck Hardwick (District 21)
 Bill Schluter (District 23) (redistricted to District 24, ran for State Senate)
 Louis F. Kosco (District 38) (ran for State Senate)

Summary of races 
Voters in each legislative district elect two members to the New Jersey General Assembly.

District 1

General election

District 2

General election

District 3

General election

District 4

General election

District 5

General election

District 6

General election

District 7

General election

District 8

General election

District 9

General election

District 10

General election

District 11

General election

District 12

General election

District 13

General election

District 14

General election

District 15

General election

District 16

General election

District 17

General election

District 18

General election

District 19

General election

District 20

General election

District 21

General election

District 22

General election

District 23

General election

District 24

General election

District 25

General election

District 26

General election

District 27

General election

District 28

General election

District 29

General election

District 30

General election

District 31

General election

District 32

General election

District 33

General election

District 34

General election

District 35

General election

District 36

General election

District 37

General election

District 38

General election

District 39

General election

District 40

General election

Notes

References 

1991
New Jersey General Assembly
1991 New Jersey elections